William Ratcliff may refer to:

William Ratcliff, a play by Heinrich Heine, and its several operatic adaptations 
William Ratcliff (Cui) (premiered 1869), Russian opera  by César Cui
Guglielmo Ratcliff (premiered 1895), a later opera by Pietro Mascagni
Ratcliff (premiered 1914), an opera by Volkmar Andreae
 William Ratcliff (film), a 1922 Austrian silent film

See also
William Ratcliffe (1882–1963), British Army soldier and recipient of the Victoria Cross